The Battle of Aiken (also known as the Action at Aiken) occurred on February 11, 1865, as General William Tecumseh Sherman made his way across South Carolina.  The principal commanders were Union Maj. Gen. Hugh Judson Kilpatrick and Confederate Maj. Gen. Joseph Wheeler. Wheeler was able to score a minor victory over Kilpatrick. Today, an annual re-enactment is held the final full weekend in February. As of May 2022, 28 reenactments of Aiken have been held.

Battle

Fighting 
Before the battle, on February 1, General Sherman began to invade South Carolina. During the invasion he ordered Hugh Judson Kilpatrick and his cavalry corps from the Fifth U.S Cavalry to march through South Carolina. By February 5, he crossed into Aiken County where he would engage in battle with Joseph Wheeler's cavalry corps. Wheeler attacked Kilpatrick, who didn't expect any resistance, despite having orders to not pursue Kilpatrick's cavalry. Wheeler moved to defend the city of Augusta from the Union army. His army was stationed at 204 Park Avenue between Benjamin Franklin Cheatham and James Argle Smith's forces. The Aiken Home Guard and a cavalry corps were under Wheeler's command. He planned to defeat Kilpatrick by forming his cavalry into a "V" shaped formation with skirmishers deployed above it. When Kilpatrick charged the skirmishers, they would retreat into the center of the "V." Once Kilpatrick entered the formation the tips of the "V" would collapse, thus encircling Kilpatrick. On February 11, at 9:00 AM, the battle started. Wheeler's plan would have worked if had not been for a single Confederate soldier who fired his gun prematurely. Resulting in Wheeler ordering all of his soldiers to attack the Union forces. The armies engaged in hand-to-hand combat all across the town. During the fighting, it was reported that a Confederate soldier ran up to Kilpatrick and attacked the general with his pistol. However, the pistol did not go off. After Kilpatrick lost the battle, so he retreated back to his defenses at Montmorenci. For the rest of the day Confederate and Union soldiers skirmished. This was until the two commanders signed a truce and agreed to collect the bodies. Later, on February 13, Kilpatrick retreated and rejoined Sherman. Despite all of this, Kilpatrick declared himself victorious. In the aftermath of the battle, Wheeler's decision to attack Kilpatrick left the Edisto River, and in turn Columbia, vulnerable.

Casualties 
According to General Kilpatrick, he had killed 31 Confederate soldiers, wounded 160, and captured 60. This would result in the Confederates taking 251 Casualties. However general Wheeler states that he had suffered 50 casualties and that he had killed 53 Union soldiers, wounded 270, and captured 172. This totals to 495 Union Casualties.

In popular culture 
To commemorate the battle, a granite monument was erected at the intersection of Richland Avenue and Chesterfield Street. The people of the country reenact the battle annually on rural land located several miles away from the area where the battle was actually fought. According to the Southern Cultures journal, the residents of the city possibly reenact this battle as an attempt to score a "symbolic blow against the hated enemy of their ancestors and perhaps, against what they see as their enemies modern counterparts: The champions of political correctness in general and historical revisionism, and beyond those a leviathan bureaucratic state, which intervenes in their lives in unwanted (as well as welcome) ways" (by which of course they mean federally enforced racial equality). The first reenactment of the battle happened in 1965. It was organized by John A May and Herman Boland. Both of these men were descendants of Confederate veterans. According to the previously mentioned Southern Cultures journal, the tradition of reenacting the battle had become "suspect." Resulting in the people of the town trying to "hold on to their 'southernerness'" by defending the practice. In 2005 Christopher Forbes and with Michael G Hennessy directed and co-wrote The Battle of Aiken, a film about this battle.

References

Further reading
Boylston, Jr., Raymond P. Battle of Aiken. Self-published, 2003.
Jones, Wayne R. and Thomas D. Perry. Ten Minutes of Blind Confusion: The Battle of Aiken Kilpatrick vs. Wheeler February 11, 1865. Create Space, 2011.
Rigdon, John C. The Battle of Aiken. Powder Springs, Georgia: Eastern Digital Resources, 1998
Vandevelde, Isabel R. The Battle of Aiken. Aiken, South Carolina: Art Studio Press, 1997.

1865 in South Carolina
Aiken County, South Carolina
Aiken
Aiken
Aiken
Aiken
February 1865 events